The Nash Haul Thrift (sometimes "Haulthrift") was a series of trucks produced by Nash Motors from 1947 until 1954, mainly for export markets. 

Nash dealers in the United States had the option of ordering these trucks, but few were sold and most were for dealership use or as tow trucks.

Design
The first Nash trucks were the continuation of the Jeffery Quad, an all-wheel drive, all-wheel steered vehicle for military and civilian use. The Nash Quads were produced until 1928. Thereafter, Nash focused on building high-quality cars. The automaker developed a line of commercial vehicles in 1947 for export markets and offered them to its domestic dealerships.

Two models were available: 
 Nash 3148 a 133-inch-wheelbase weighing around 
 Nash 3248 a 157-inch-wheelbase weighing around 

Nash's trucks looked more luxurious than other trucks available then, reminiscent of the contemporary Nash 600 passenger car from which much of the bodywork came. The fenders were the same as for the passenger car, albeit with larger openings made by a second panel stamping. 

The truck's engine came from the Nash Ambassador although in a lower state of tune, producing . A four-speed manual transmission was standard with an optional Timken double-reduction hypoid vacuum-shift rear axle. The Studebaker Champion's smaller engine was offered on some models. 

Approximately 5,000 Nash Haul Thrift trucks were produced and sold.

Nash truck prototypes
The Haul Thrift line was the only trucks that Nash produced and marketed after World War II. The company developed a prototype pickup truck in 1942, but meeting the demand for automobiles was a higher priority. Between 1946 and 1949, several prototypes or styling exercises of light-duty pickup trucks were built, but Nash's unibody design made it difficult for such designs to reach production.

Collectability
The Nash Car Club has about 30 of these Nash trucks registered among its members as of 2010. Some of these original Nash dealer tow trucks were converted to flatbed stake bodies.

References

External links 

 1953 Nash Haul Thrift Trucks brochure
 1947 Nash 3148 Haul Thrift at imcdb

Haul Thrift
Pickup trucks
1950s cars
Rear-wheel-drive vehicles
Motor vehicles manufactured in the United States
Cars introduced in 1947